IDL may refer to:

Computing 
 Interface description language, any computer language used to describe a software component's interface
 IDL specification language, the original IDL created by Lamb, Wulf and Nestor at Queen's University, Canada
 OMG IDL, an IDL standardized by Object Management Group selected by the W3C for exposing the DOM of XML, HTML, CSS, and SVG documents
 Microsoft Interface Definition Language, an extension of OMG IDL for supporting Microsoft's DCOM services
 Web IDL, a variation of an IDL for describing APIs that are intended to be implemented in Web browsers 
 Interactive Data Language, a data analysis language popular for science applications
 ICAD Design Language, a knowledge-based engineering language used with the software ICAD

Places
 John F. Kennedy International Airport, formerly named Idlewild Airport with IATA airport code IDL
 Indianola Municipal Airport, by FAA airport code
 Inner Dispersal Loop, the common name of Interstate 444, a highway in downtown Tulsa, Oklahoma

Other uses 
 International Date Line, the time zone date boundary
 Intermediate-density lipoprotein
 International Drivers License
 International Darts League, a defunct major darts tournament
 IDL Drug Stores, a now-defunct independent drug store cooperative
 Internet Defense League, a website